Eduardo María de la Peña (born 7 June 1955) is a retired football midfielder who played most of his career in the Uruguayan Primera División. He also played for Uruguay in the 1979 Copa América.

Career
Born in Minas, De la Peña began playing professional football with Club Nacional de Football in 1976. The same year the Nacional midfielder won the local championship.

In 1982, De la Peña moved to Mexico to play for Mexican Primera División side Tecos de la UAG. Two seasons later, he went to Argentina to play for Argentine Primera División side Club Atlético Huracán.

De la Peña played in the Uruguay national football team for four years, making 19 appearances and scoring one goal. He participated in the 1979 Copa América.

References

External links
 
 
 Eduardo de la Peña at BDFA.com.ar 

1955 births
Living people
Uruguayan footballers
Uruguay international footballers
1979 Copa América players
Uruguayan Primera División players
Liga MX players
Argentine Primera División players
Club Nacional de Football players
Tecos F.C. footballers
Club Atlético Huracán footballers
Uruguayan expatriate footballers
Expatriate footballers in Mexico
Expatriate footballers in Argentina
Association football midfielders